Amami is the third album released by the Italian singer Arisa, it features the singles "La notte" and "L'amore è un'altra cosa".

Track list

Charts

References 

2012 albums
Arisa albums
Warner Music Group albums
Italian-language albums